Myoxanthus (from Greek for "dormouse" and "flower") is a genus of orchids with about 50 species, widely distributed in Central and South America. This genus is a close ally of Pleurothallis.

The genera Chaetocephala Barb.Rodr., Dubois-Reymondia H.Karst., Duboisia H.Karst. and Reymondia H.Karst. & Kuntze have been included in Myoxanthus.

References 

 
Pleurothallidinae genera
Taxa named by Eduard Friedrich Poeppig